The 1978–79 Buffalo Sabres season was the Sabres' ninth season of operation for the National Hockey League franchise that was established on May 22, 1970.

Offseason

Regular season

Final standings

Schedule and results

Playoffs

Player statistics

Awards and records

Transactions

Draft picks
Buffalo's draft picks at the 1978 NHL Amateur Draft held at the Queen Elizabeth Hotel in Montreal, Quebec.

Farm teams

See also
1978–79 NHL season

References

Buffalo Sabres seasons
Buffalo
Buffalo
Buffalo
Buffalo